Renée Jeanne Hugon (21 September 1930 – 7 July 2015) was a French gymnast. She competed in six events at the 1960 Summer Olympics.

References

External links
 

1930 births
2015 deaths
French female artistic gymnasts
Olympic gymnasts of France
Gymnasts at the 1960 Summer Olympics
Gymnasts from Paris